William Odd Johansen (July 27, 1928 – March 21, 2001) was a Canadian professional ice hockey centre. He played in one NHL game for the Toronto Maple Leafs during the 1949–50 season, on November 26, 1949 against the Boston Bruins. Born in Oslo, Norway, he grew up in Port Arthur, Ontario. He married Nan Courtney, and had four children. After retiring from hockey, he worked as a pipe fitter until. He died from cancer in 2001.

Career statistics

Regular season and playoffs

See also
 List of players who played only one game in the NHL

References

External links
 

1928 births
2001 deaths
Canadian expatriate ice hockey players in the United States
Canadian ice hockey centres
Charlotte Checkers (EHL) players
Ice hockey people from Ontario
Ice hockey people from Oslo
New York Rovers players
Norwegian emigrants to Canada
Ontario Hockey Association Senior A League (1890–1979) players
Ottawa Senators (QSHL) players
Providence Bruins players
Spokane Comets players
Sportspeople from Thunder Bay
Toronto Maple Leafs players
Vancouver Canucks (WHL) players
Winnipeg Warriors (minor pro) players